James Riley is an American former Negro league second baseman who played in the 1940s.

Riley played for the Birmingham Black Barons in 1945. In five recorded games, he posted one hit in 11 plate appearances.

References

External links
 and Seamheads

Year of birth missing
Place of birth missing
Birmingham Black Barons players
Baseball second basemen